Institute for Middle East Understanding (IMEU) is a 501(c)(3) Pro-Palestinian non-profit advocacy organization.

In 2006 it received a grant from the Jerusalem Fund for Education and Community Development which was used to undertake the first compilation of profiles of Palestinian-Americans in the fields of the arts, literature, academia, business and community service, which were then disseminated to news media and on the Internet

As an example, the IMEU sent a letter to news outlets in November 2007 that provided the names and profiles of Palestinian-Americans who could be contacted to discuss the upcoming Annapolis conference. The names included, Samar Assad, Executive Director of the Washington, DC-based Jerusalem Fund for Education and Community Development, Diana Buttu, a Ramallah-based attorney and former advisor to Palestinian negotiators, Omar Dajani, a San Francisco-based law professor and former legal advisor to United Nations Special Envoy Terje Roed-Larson, and Nadia Hijab, a Senior Fellow at the Washington, DC-based Institute for Palestine Studies.

One of the organization's co-founders is Lena Khalaf Tuffaha, who is also a member of the American-Arab Anti-Discrimination Committee (ADC) Seattle chapter. As Secretary and Treasurer of the IMEU, she and the organization were featured in the Non-Profit Spotlight of the e-magazine The Mideast Connect. 
The IMEU also publishes 'Letters from Palestine' (2006), which were cited as a good resource for first-hand testimonies from Palestinians about their daily lives by Deborah Pike in the Borderlands journal.

References

External links 
 Institute for Middle East Understanding

Non-governmental organizations involved in the Israeli–Palestinian conflict
Israel–United States relations
Palestinian-American culture
2005 establishments in the United States
Organizations established in 2005